Jacquelyn Michelle Guerra Arnaldi (born 25 September 1989), known as Jackie Guerra, is an American-born former Puerto Rican footballer who played as a midfielder. She was a member of the Puerto Rico women's national team.

Early and personal life
Guerra was raised in Plano, Texas. Her parents are from Puerto Rico. She now lives in Redondo Beach, California.

International goals
Scores and results list Puerto Rico's goal tally first.

References

1989 births
Living people
Women's association football midfielders
Puerto Rican women's footballers
Puerto Rico women's international footballers
American women's soccer players
Soccer players from Dallas
Sportspeople from Plano, Texas
American sportspeople of Puerto Rican descent
Illinois Fighting Illini women's soccer players